The Orkney Islands Council, is the local authority for Orkney, Scotland. It was established in 1975 by the Local Government (Scotland) Act 1973 and was largely unaffected by the Scottish local government changes of the mid-1990s.

It provides services in the areas of Environmental Health, Roads, Social Work, Community Development, Organisational Development, Economic Development, Building Standards, Trading Standards, Housing, Waste, Education, Burial Grounds, Port and Harbours and others. The council is allowed to collect Council Tax.

The council is also the harbour authority for Orkney and its Marine Services division manages the operation of the islands' 29 piers and harbours.

Elections

2012
Between 2012 and 2017 the council consisted of 21 members, all of whom were independent; they did not stand as representatives of a political party.

These members are elected in the following wards:

East Mainland, South Ronaldsay and Burray (3 members)
Kirkwall East (4 members)
Kirkwall West and Orphir (4 members)
North Isles (3 members)
Stromness and South Isles (3 members)
West Mainland (4 members).

2017
After the 2017 election there were 18 independents, 2 Orkney Manifesto Group (OMG) councillors and 1 Green councillor. Of these, 18 councillors were actually elected; the remaining 3 were declared on the election day "as the result of the uncontested election in the Stromness and South Isles ward, where the number of candidates was equal to or less than the number of seats available".

There were no official changes to the political composition of the council during the 2017-2022 term. However, independent councillor John Ross Scott (Kirkwall East) did announce he had joined the Greens in 2021, which did not change his affiliation on the council. One by-election was held and resulted in an independent hold.

The 2017 election elected these members:
Candidates elected to form the new Council alongside Rob Crichton, James Stockan and Magnus Thomson in the uncontested Stromness and South Isles ward are:

Kirkwall East ward - David Dawson, Steven Heddle, John Ross Scott, Gwenda Shearer.

Kirkwall West and Orphir - Sandy Cowie, Barbara Foulkes, Leslie Manson, John Richards.

West Mainland - Harvey Johnston, Rachael King, Owen Tierney, Duncan Allan Tullock.

East Mainland - South Ronaldsay and Burray - Norman Craigie, Andrew Drever, Steve Sankey.

North Isles - Stephen Clackson, Graham Sinclair, Kevin Woodbridge.

2022
After the 2022 election there were 19 independents, and 2 Green councillors.

Composition

Leaders

Political Leaders

Convenors

See also
 Constitutional status of Orkney, Shetland and the Western Isles
 Lerwick Declaration

References

 

Organisations based in Orkney
Local authorities of Scotland
Politics of Orkney
Kirkwall